The former Fourth Church of Christ, Scientist, now known as the Internet Archive, is a historic Christian Science church building located at 300 Funston Avenue, corner of Clement Street, in the Richmond District of San Francisco, California. Built in 1923, it was designed by noted San Francisco architect Carl Werner in the Classical Revival style of architecture. The size of the building is about 23,000 square feet.

The original cost for its construction was cited at about $125,000 in a 1922 issue of Building and Engineering News; meanwhile The Bridgemen's Magazine and the Engineering News-Record cited a $150,000 figure.

Due to the dwindling size of its congregation and the increased cost of maintaining such a large building, the building was sold in 2009 to the Internet Archive for $4.5 million. The organization chose the church based on its Greek Revival design, which resembles the logo of the Internet Archive. The last church service was held on Thanksgiving Day of that year. Although no longer listed in the Christian Science Journal,  Fourth Church of Christ, Scientist is still listed by the California Secretary of State as being active with an office in Hillsborough.

See also
List of former Christian Science churches, societies and buildings
 Fourth Church of Christ, Scientist (disambiguation)

References

External links
 
 Video tour of Fourth Church of Christ Scientist

Churches in San Francisco
Former Christian Science churches, societies and buildings in California
Richmond District, San Francisco
Churches completed in 1913
1913 establishments in California
1910s architecture in the United States
Neoclassical architecture in California
Neoclassical church buildings in the United States